Aangan Ki Kali is a 1979 Bollywood drama film directed and produced by Harsh Kohli. Music is by Bappi Lahiri. This is one of the few Hindi films that deals with adoption.

Plot 
Anmol (Rakesh Roshan) and Sunita (Lakshmi) are a happily married couple.  However, Sunita has a serious heart condition.  She could risk a dangerous operation or live only a few more years.  Her medical condition could get worse if she ever gets pregnant.  She falls in love with an orphan named Bhavana and wants to adopt her.  But her husband wants Sunita to get better, so they can have their own children.  He doesn't care about Bhavana and gets upset with her over her childlike behavior, but when she runs away from home, he goes after her and asks her to come home.  Together, they convince Sunita to have the risky operation, from which she recovers.  Anmol and Sunita adopt Bhavana, and they all live happily ever after.

Cast 
 Rakesh Roshan as Anmol
 Lakshmi (actress) as Sunita
 Prema Narayan as Doctor
 Geeta Khann as Bhavana
 Leela Chitnis

Music 
 "Saiya Bina Ghar Suna Suna" - Bhupinder Singh, Lata Mangeshkar
 "Deewana, Deewana, Deewana Hai Kar GayiDeewana" - Bappi Lahiri
 "Na Ro Na Munni Tu Na Ro Nanhe Nanhe Moti Yu Na Kho" - Kishore Kumar
 "Naa Ro Naa Munni (II)" - Kishore Kumar
 "Tumhe Kaise Kahu Mai Dil Ki Baat" - Lata Mangeshkar
 "Dhoop Bhi Dekhi, Dekhi Chhaya" - Aarti Mukherjee
 "Jai Ho Mata Tumhari" - Aarti Mukherjee, Chandrani Mukherjee
 "Meri Munni Bata" - Dilraj Kaur, Shivangi Kolhapure

References

External links 
 

1979 films
1970s Hindi-language films
Films scored by Bappi Lahiri
Indian drama films